Amy Beth Dziewiontkowski (born May 3, 1968), known professionally as Amy Ryan, is an American actress of stage and screen. A graduate of New York's High School of Performing Arts, she is an Academy Award nominee and two-time Tony Award nominee.

Ryan began her professional stage career in 1987 and made her Broadway debut in 1993 as a replacement in the original production of The Sisters Rosensweig. She was featured in season 1 episode 22 of Home Improvement as Jill’s sister going through a relationship spat during Tim’s poker game. She went on to receive Tony Award nominations for Best Featured Actress in a Play for the 2000 revival of Uncle Vanya and the 2005 revival of A Streetcar Named Desire. She was nominated for an Academy Award for Best Supporting Actress for her performance as Helene McCready in the 2007 film Gone Baby Gone. The role also earned her a Golden Globe nomination and won her a Critics' Choice Award. Her other films include Changeling (2008), Win Win (2011) and Birdman or (The Unexpected Virtue of Ignorance) (2014). On television, she played Beadie Russell in HBO's The Wire (2002–2008), Holly Flax in NBC's The Office (2008–2011) and Adele Brousse in HBO's In Treatment (2010). In 2021, she had a main role in the Hulu comedy series Only Murders in the Building.

Early life
Ryan was born Amy Beth Dziewiontkowski in Flushing, Queens in New York City, the daughter of Pamela (née Ryan), a nurse, and John Dziewiontkowski, a trucking business owner. She is of Polish, Irish, and English descent. Growing up in the 1970s, Ryan and her sister Laura delivered the Daily News by bike. At a young age, Ryan attended the Stagedoor Manor Performing Arts Center in upstate New York. At 17, she graduated from New York's High School of Performing Arts. Hired for the national tour of Biloxi Blues right out of high school, Ryan worked steadily off-Broadway for the next decade. She chose her mother's maiden name as her stage name.

Career

Theatre
Ryan made her off-Broadway debut in the Westside Theatre's 1987 production of A Shayna Maidel, playing the role of Hanna. The following year she was seen in the Second Stage Theatre Company's revival of The Rimers of Eldritch. Additional off-Broadway credits include As Bees In Honey Drown, Crimes of the Heart and Saved. She also worked in regional theater, where she originated roles in new plays by Neil LaBute, Arthur Miller and Neil Simon. On Broadway she has appeared as Tess in The Sisters Rosensweig, Natasha in the 1997 revival of The Three Sisters, and Peggy in the 2001–2002 revival of The Women.

Ryan was nominated for the Tony Award for Best Performance by a Featured Actress in a Play twice: in 2000, for her portrayal of Sonya Alexandrovna in Uncle Vanya, and in 2005, for her performance as Stella Kowalski opposite John C. Reilly in A Streetcar Named Desire.

Ryan received some of the best reviews of her career for her leading role in the Roundabout Theater Company's 2016 production of Love, Love, Love. Ben Brantley of The New York Times praised her "smashing comic performance," The Hollywood Reporter called her work "emotionally vital," and The Associated Press raved that "Ryan is absolutely magnetic ... nailing her charming, unpredictable character with perfect comedic timing." In an article exploring various famous actresses working on the stage, The Washington Post theater critic Peter Marks highlighted Ryan's work in the play:

The revelation is not that Amy Ryan is good. It's that she's this good ... Ryan, whose range has been apparent for years, in dramatic performances nominated for Tonys (Uncle Vanya) and Oscars (Gone Baby Gone), as well as in nuanced comic turns on television shows like The Office, manages a feat in Love, Love, Love that she's never accomplished so fluidly before: taking charge. She delivers a front-and-center performance of such beguiling dynamism (in a thoroughly convincing English accent) that you feel this Roundabout Theatre Company production has done for her precisely what was intended. It exposes a new facet of her talent — and leaves us with that uplifting itch, to be there the next time she's on a stage.

For her performance in Love, Love, Love, Ryan won the Obie Award for Distinguished Performance by an Actress, and was nominated for the Drama Desk Award for Outstanding Actress in a Play and the Drama League Award for Distinguished Performance.

Television

Following a brief stint playing a runaway on As the World Turns, Ryan was cast in television series such as I'll Fly Away, After roles on ER and Chicago Hope, Ryan became a series regular on The Naked Truth as Téa Leoni's spoiled stepdaughter. In 1993, she made her first appearance on NBC's Law & Order, appearing in several episodes over the years.

By 2001, director Sidney Lumet cast her in 100 Centre Street playing three different roles (Ellen, Paris and Rebecca). Ryan went on to feature prominently in the second season of HBO's The Wire, playing Port Authority Officer Beadie Russell. She appeared for a six-episode arc on The Office as dorky HR rep Holly Flax. She reprised her role on The Office in seasons 5 and 7.

Ryan joined the cast of HBO's In Treatment for its third season, playing the therapist of Dr. Paul Weston.

Film
Because of the deletion of the scene where she played Eric Stoltz's wife in Allison Anders's Grace of My Heart, Ryan made her 1999 film debut in Roberta. She then briefly appeared in You Can Count on Me, which starred Laura Linney and Mark Ruffalo, and the mystery/thriller Keane. Albert Brooks chose her to play his wife in Looking for Comedy in the Muslim World in 2005, and 2007 brought both Dan in Real Life and Before the Devil Knows You're Dead. Her role as a star-struck sheriff's wife in Capote earned her positive reviews, but it was playing a hardened welfare mom in Ben Affleck's Gone Baby Gone that finally brought her national attention.

After being voted Best Supporting Actress for Gone Baby Gone by the National Board of Review, as well as the critics circles in New York, Los Angeles, Boston, San Francisco and Washington, D.C., Ryan's performance was also nominated for a Golden Globe Award, a Screen Actors Guild Award, and an Oscar for Best Performance by an Actress in a Supporting role at the 80th Academy Awards.

Ryan appeared in Changeling (2008), directed by Clint Eastwood, and opposite Matt Damon in Paul Greengrass's Green Zone (2010). In September 2010, she completed filming a role in Philip Seymour Hoffman's directorial film debut, Jack Goes Boating, taking over the role of Connie originally played by Beth Cole in the stage version. Ryan received strong notices for her performance in Tom McCarthy's Win Win the next year, winning Best Supporting Actress awards from multiple regional critics groups.

Ryan was a part of the core ensemble of the 2014 Best Picture Academy Award winning film Birdman, sharing in the cast's Screen Actors Guild Award for Outstanding Performance by a Cast in a Motion Picture victory. In 2015, she starred as Mary Donovan opposite Tom Hanks in the film Bridge of Spies, and reunited with her In Treatment co-star Gabriel Byrne in Louder Than Bombs, the English-language debut of Joachim Trier. Early the next year, Ryan was cast as Tracy, her first on-screen leading role, in Abundant Acreage Available, a rural family drama from Junebug screenwriter Angus MacLachlan. Upon the film's premiere at the 2017 Tribeca Film Festival, Ryan drew universal acclaim for her performance, with The Wrap noting that she "holds the screen no matter what she's doing and who she's with" and Flavorwire raving that Ryan "sounds notes that are quietly dazzling in their complexity." Variety chief film critic Peter Debruge dubbed the performance a career highlight:

It's a pleasure to see such a fine actress navigate the nuances of her role ... Only on the big screen are we able to fully appreciate the minutely detailed nature of Ryan's performance, revealing Tracy's soul via the slightest narrowing of the eyes or the almost-subliminal tensing of her cheekbones. As we know, Junebug earned Amy Adams an Oscar nomination, and if the world were fair, this role would bring another Amy similar attention.

In 2018, Ryan co-starred in Beautiful Boy for Amazon Studios, a dark family drama, with her The Office co-star Steve Carell, and Timothée Chalamet. She was then among the ensemble cast of 2019's Late Night, the Mindy Kaling-penned comedy about a female late-night talk show host (Emma Thompson); and Strange but True, a noir-thriller based on the novel by John Searles. In 2020, Ryan starred as Mari Gilbert, a real life woman searching for her missing daughter, in Netflix's mystery thriller Lost Girls.

Personal life
Ryan married Eric Slovin in 2011. They have one daughter born in October 2009.

Filmography

Awards and nominations

References

External links

The Wire biography from the HBO website
Interview with Amy Ryan on her rôle in Gone Baby Gone from filmplosion.com

Actresses from New York City
American film actresses
American people of English descent
American people of Irish descent
American people of Polish descent
American stage actresses
American television actresses
Living people
20th-century American actresses
21st-century American actresses
Fiorello H. LaGuardia High School alumni
Outstanding Performance by a Cast in a Motion Picture Screen Actors Guild Award winners
People from Flushing, Queens
1968 births